Sir FitzGerald Aylmer, 6th Baronet (14 September 1736 – February 1794) was an Irish politician and baronet.

Aylmer was the son of Sir Gerald Aylmer, 5th Baronet and Lucy Norris. On 6 January 1737 he succeeded to his father's baronetcy. He served as High Sheriff of Kildare in 1761. He entered the Irish House of Commons as the Member of Parliament for Roscommon Borough in 1761, holding the seat until 1768. Between 1768 and 1776 Aylmer sat as the MP for Old Leighlin, and he represented Kildare Borough from 1776 to 1783. His final seat was Harristown, which he represented between 1783 and his death in 1794.

He married Elizabeth Cole, daughter of Fenton Cole and Dorothy Sanderson, on 15 September 1764. He was succeeded in his title his eldest son, Fenton.

References

1736 births
1794 deaths
Baronets in the Baronetage of Ireland
High Sheriffs of Kildare
Irish MPs 1761–1768
Irish MPs 1769–1776
Irish MPs 1776–1783
Irish MPs 1783–1790
Irish MPs 1790–1797
Members of the Parliament of Ireland (pre-1801) for County Roscommon constituencies
Members of the Parliament of Ireland (pre-1801) for County Carlow constituencies
Members of the Parliament of Ireland (pre-1801) for County Kildare constituencies